William Stanford Reid (13 September 1913 – 28 December 1996), usually cited as W. Stanford Reid, was a professor of history at McGill University and the University of Guelph and a Presbyterian Church in Canada minister.  He held a Doctor of Philosophy degree from the University of Pennsylvania (1941). He also had a divinity degree from Westminster Theological Seminary, studying under the Presbyterian scholar J. Gresham Machen.

Notes

He was the son of Rev. William Dunn Reid and Daisy Sanford. His brother was Stewart Reid - Montreal, Quebec. His parents were Joseph Reid b. 1838 and Janet Dunn b. 1863.  His grandparents were some of the first Scottish settlers in the Eastern Townships of Quebec arriving in the late 1820s. His grandparents were William Reid and Jean Gould  and Andrew Dunn and Elisabeth Oliver.

References

Further reading
"W. Stanford Reid -- A Classic Case of Exclusion". A. Donald Macleod. Fall 1999 Channels, Vol. 16 No. 1.
W. Stanford Reid: an evangelical Calvinist in the academy. A. Donald Macleod. McGill-Queen's Press - MQUP, 2004. .
"Lutheranism In The Scottish Reformation". W. Stanford Reid. Westminster Theological Journal. Vol.7 No.2. May 1945.
"The Historical Development of Christian Scientific Presuppositions". W. Stanford Reid. JASA. Vol.27 (June 1975): 69–75.
"Science and Miracle: Another Approach". W. Stanford Reid. JASA. Vol.31 (September 1979): 171–172.
Reid's response to "Original Sin as Natural Evil" (article by Richard H. Bube). JASA. Vol.27 (December 1975):171-180.

External links
Reid's Worldcat identity

1913 births
1996 deaths
20th-century Canadian historians
20th-century Canadian male writers
20th-century Presbyterian ministers
Calvinist and Reformed scholars
Canadian evangelicals
Canadian historians of religion
Canadian male non-fiction writers
Canadian Presbyterian ministers
Evangelical pastors
Historians of Christianity
Academic staff of McGill University
Academic staff of the University of Guelph
University of Pennsylvania alumni
Westminster Theological Seminary alumni